Edmund Clark HonFRPS is a British artist and photographer whose work explores politics, representation, incarceration and control. His research based work combines a range of references and forms including bookmaking, installations, photography, video, documents, text and found images and material. Several of his projects explore the War on Terror.

His notable projects include Guantanamo: If The Light Goes Out, Control Order House, The Mountains of Majeed, and Negative Publicity: Artefacts of Extraordinary Rendition (in collaboration with researcher and writer Crofton Black). Edmund Clark's awards include the 2009 International Photography Award from The British Journal of Photography, 2016 Rencontres d'Arles Photo-Text Book Award and 2017 Infinity Award in Documentary and Photojournalism category from International Center of Photography. In 2018 Clark was awarded an Honorary Fellowship of the Royal Photographic Society. Edmund Clark was the Ikon Gallery's artist-in-residence at Europe's only wholly therapeutic community prison, HM Prison Grendon from 2014 until 2018. Supported by the Marie-Louise von Motesiczky Charitable Trust, the residency culminated in the publication of My Shadow's Reflection (Ikon Gallery: Birmingham and Here Press: London) and a solo exhibition In Place of Hate at Ikon Gallery.

Life and career
Clark worked as a researcher in London and Brussels before gaining a postgraduate diploma in photojournalism at London College of Communication.

He gained access to Guantanamo Bay detention camp and to a house under a control order (housing an individual held under the Terrorism Prevention and Investigation Measures Act 2011). His book Control Order House is his response to a period he spent staying in a house with a man known as 'CE' who had been placed under a Control Order due to his suspected involvement with terrorist-related activity. Clark spent three days working in the house taking a large number of quick, uncomposed photographs surveying the site. These images, along with architectural plans of the house, redacted documents relating to the case and a diary kept by 'CE' form a portrait of sorts: of the site and its inhabitant and of the structure of legal restriction imposed and represented by the house.

Publications
Still Life: Killing Time. Stockport: Dewi Lewis, 2007. 
Guantanamo: If the Light Goes Out. Stockport: Dewi Lewis, 2010. 
Control Order House. London: Here, 2013. . Edition of 250 copies.
Second edition. London: Here, 2016. . Edition of 500 copies.
The Mountains of Majeed. London: Here, 2014. . 8 photographs, 4 paintings by Majeed, 3 Taliban poems. Edition of 450 copies.
Negative Publicity: Artefacts of Extraordinary Rendition. New York: Aperture and Magnum Foundation, 2016. .
Second edition. New York: New York: Aperture and Magnum Foundation, 2017.
My Shadow's Reflection. London: Here; Birmingham: Ikon Gallery, 2018. . Edition of 1000 copies.

Awards
2009: International Photography Award, British Journal of Photography
2011: Best Photography Book of the Year at the  International Photography Awards/Lucie Awards
2011: Best Book of the Year Award at the New York Photo Awards
2012: Shortlisted for Prix Pictet: Power
2012: Best Book of the Year, Premio Ponchielli, GRIN Italian Photography Editors Association
2012: Winner Zeit Magazin Fotopreis
2013: John Kobal Foundation Grant
2011 & 2013: Best Books of the Year, Kassel Photobook Award
2014: Magnum Foundation Grant
2011 & 2015: The Roddick Foundation Grant
2016: Rencontres d'Arles Photo-Text Book Award
2017: W. Eugene Smith Memorial Fund Fellowship
2017: Infinity Award, International Center of Photography
2014: Shortlisted for the Prix Pictet for Guantánamo: If the Light Goes Out
2018: Honorary Fellowship of the Royal Photographic Society

Exhibitions
The Mountains of Majeed, Flowers Gallery, London, 27 February – 4 April 2015
Edmund Clark: Terror Incognitus, Zephyr, Reiss Engelhorn Museum, Mannheim, 31 January – 3 July 2016
Edmund Clark: War of Terror, Imperial War Museum, London, 28 July 2016 – 28 August 2017
In Place of Hate, Ikon Gallery, Birmingham, 6 December 2017 – 11 March 2018
Edmund Clark: The Day the Music Died, International Center of Photography, New York, NY, 26 January – 6 May 2018
Unseen Conflicts – War on Terror, Parrotta Contemporary Art, Cologne and Bonn, 7 September – 10 November 2018

Permanent collections
Fotomuseum Winterthur, Switzerland 
George Eastman Museum, Rochester, NY, USA 
Grinnell College, IA, USA
Imperial War Museum, London, UK 
 Museum of Fine Arts, Houston, TX, USA 
National Science and Media Museum, Bradford, UK 
National Portrait Gallery, London, UK

References

External links

Edmund Clark on Flowers Gallery website 
Edmund Clark on Parrotta Contemporary Art website
Edmund Clark on East Wing website
Biography on Prix pictet
Edmund Clark Q&A Telegraph

21st-century British photographers
Living people
Year of birth missing (living people)
Place of birth unknown
Photographers from London